At the 1952 Winter Olympics, four speed skating events were contested. The competitions were held from Saturday, 16 February to Tuesday, 19 February 1952.

Medal summary

Participating nations
Seven speed skaters competed in all four events.

A total of 67 speed skaters from 14 nations competed at the Oslo Games:

Medal table

References

External links
International Olympic Committee results database
 

 
1952 Winter Olympics events
1952
Olympics, 1952